The first ever Sambalpuri movie released was Bhukha. It was released in the year 1989 and was directed by Sabyasachi Mohapatra. It was also the first film from Odisha to get an International Jury Award at the Gijon International Film Festival. The second film in Sambalpuri language is Ulugulan (Revolution), which was released in 2008, directed by Mahmood Hussain and produced by Purnabasi Sahu. Its story is set in the first half of the 18th century and depicts the tyrannical rule of the Nagpur rulers.

In 2013 a Sambalpuri Odia film was released called Alar:- The Orphan, which also became the first-ever commercial cinema (Previous two were Art/Parallel Cinema) of Saliwood. Story/Screenplay/Produced by: Manabhanjan Nayak and Directed by: Litu Mohanty.

Films

References

Sambalpur
Cinema of Odisha